"Part of the List" is a song by American recording artist Ne-Yo. It was released as the fourth single from his album Year of the Gentleman and was produced by Chuck Harmony. It was released to U.S. radio in April 2009. It is his first single to not chart at all in the UK top 200 and Billboard Hot 100.

Music video

The music video for "Part of the List" was directed by Taj and features Ne-Yo inside of a music store. While looking through the CD's, he notices his ex-girlfriend, Claire (played by model Bre Joyner). They greet each other when Claire's fiancé, Martin, comes. After hearing this, Ne-Yo stutters, and quickly walks away.

The next scene shows Claire and Ne-Yo chasing a taxi. After catching it, Ne-Yo kisses Claire, and Claire leaves in the taxi. Shortly afterwards, Ne-Yo starts to try to get Claire's attention, but stops. Later on, Claire and Ne-Yo meet on a bridge. Claire starts to hug Ne-Yo, then says "I miss you."  They then continue to talk on the bridge, and Claire looks around carefully. They then hang out in the city until the day is over.

At night, Claire is awake and cannot stop thinking about Ne-Yo. Then, flashbacks are seen with Claire and Ne-Yo having fun. Claire and Martin then eat breakfast, smiling at each other. Meanwhile, Ne-Yo and his current girlfriend, the one from "Mad", are getting out of bed. At the same time, Claire texts Ne-yo saying "Baby, last night was fun.", without Martin knowing. Ne-Yo's current girlfriend sees the text before Ne-Yo does, which foreshadows the beginning of "Mad". Ne-Yo leaves the room, while his current girlfriend follows, with a heartbroken look on her face.

The music video ends where the music video for "Mad" starts, making "Part of the List" a prelude to "Mad".

Charts

References

2009 singles
Ne-Yo songs
Contemporary R&B ballads
Pop ballads
Songs written by Chuck Harmony
Songs written by Ne-Yo
Song recordings produced by Chuck Harmony
2008 songs
Def Jam Recordings singles
2000s ballads